The 2012–13 season of the Hoofdklasse is competed in six leagues, three Saturday leagues and three Sunday leagues. The champions of each group promoted direct to the 2013–14 Topklasse.

Teams

Saturday A

Saturday B

Saturday C

Sunday A

Sunday B

Sunday C

League tables

Saturday A 

In determining which teams relegate directly and which teams are allowed to play the playoffs to avoid relegation, only the achieved number of points is considered. The  goal difference is completely ignored.
Therefore, ARC and Volendam were considered to have ended equal and had to play an additional match against each other on neutral ground to decide which team was allowed to enter the playoffs.

Saturday B

Saturday C

Sunday A

Sunday B

Sunday C

Promotion/relegation play-off Topklasse – Hoofdklasse

First round 
The 3 period winners of each league are grouped together and play a semi-competition to decide which of the three continues to the second round. Each team plays one match at home and one match away.

Saturday A

Saturday B

Saturday C

Sunday A

Sunday B

Sunday C

Second and Final round 
The 3 remaining teams from the Saturday leagues and the team ranked 13th in the 2012–13 Topklasse Saturday league play in a knock-out system for 1 spot in the 2013–14 Topklasse Saturday league.
Likewise, the 3 remaining teams from the Sunday leagues and the team ranked 13th in the 2012–13 Topklasse Sunday league play in a knock-out system for 1 spot in the 2013–14 Topklasse Sunday league.
For details and results see 2012–13 Topklasse promotion/relegation play-offs.

Promotion/relegation play-off Hoofdklasse – Eerste Klasse

Saturday 
The teams ranked 11th and 12th of each of the 3 Saturday leagues (6 teams) and the 3 period winners of each of the 5 Saturday Eerste Klasse leagues (15 teams), making a total of 21 teams are grouped in 7 groups of 3 teams in  such a way that the Hoofdklasse teams each end up in a different group. In each group the 3 teams play a semi-competition in such a way that each team plays one match at home and one match away.
The 7 group winners will play next season in the 2013–14 Hoofdklasse and the remaining teams in the 2013–14 Eerste klasse.

Group 1

Group 2

Group 3

Group 4

Group 5

Group 6

Group 7

Sunday 
The teams ranked 11th and 12th of each of the 3 Sunday leagues (6 teams) and the 3 period winners of each of the 6 Sunday Eerste Klasse leagues (18 teams), making a total of 24 teams, play in a 2-round 2 leg knockout system in such a way that the Hoofdklasse teams can never meet each other.
The 6 winners of the second round matches will play next season in the 2013–14 Hoofdklasse and the remaining teams in the 2013–14 Eerste klasse.

Updated to games played on 30 May 2013.Source:

"Lucky losers" play-off Hoofdklasse – Eerste Klasse Sunday 
End of season several clubs/teams from the Sunday leagues decided to switch from the Sunday to the Saturday leagues. The most important reason for doing so was the hope the attract a bigger audience on Saturdays. Among these clubs/teams were 3 Sunday Hoofdklasse teams, Argon, Feyenoord and Hilversum. The decision of Hilversum resulted in an extra spot, in the Sunday Hoofdklasse leagues, becoming available.

Therefore, the teams who lost in the second/final round of the regular promotion/relegation play-off Hoofdklasse – Eerste Klasse Sunday were allowed to compete for this extra spot in a 2-round system.

First round 
In the first round the 6 teams were paired up 2 by 2 to decide in a single match which ones were going to proceed to the second/final round. The home advantage was drawn by lot.

Since Feyenoord had already decided to switch to the Saturday leagues, it was decided, after consultation between Feyenoord and the KNVB, to withdraw Feyenoord from the "Lucky losers" play-off. As a result, Quick (H) proceeded to the second/final round without playing.

Second/Final round 
A second spot became available when Achilles '29, as champion of the 2012–13 Topklasse Sunday league, decided to promote to the 2013–14 Eerste Divisie. Promotion from the Topklasse to the Eerste Divisie is not mandatory and in general declined by the champions of the Topklasse leagues, as done by Katwijk, the champion of 2012–13 Topklasse Saturday league. See 2012–13 Topklasse Championship play-offs for details.

So, the 3 remaining teams were now competing for 2 open spots in the 2013–14 Hoofdklasse Sunday leagues.

However, with the competition already in progress, a third spot became available. Right after the Topklasse / Hoofdklasse playoff semifinals match between Alphense Boys and Haaglandia, a big fight took place. Both teams received a fine of Euro 200,00. Additionally Alphense Boys, as a disciplinary measure, was relegated to the Eerste Klasse, because the club was held accountable for the behavior of their supporters who were designated as the cause for the fight. Alphense Boys lost the appeal against the punishment and decided not to try for a second appeal.

The 3 teams were supposed to play a semi-competition with each team playing one match at home and one match away. With eventually 3 open spots available, all 3 teams were allowed to play in the 2013–14 Hoofdklasse Sunday leagues. Therefore, the last match between Joure and Deurne was cancelled.
Updated to games played on 9 June 2013.

References 

 www.knvb.nl

Vierde Divisie seasons
Neth
4